Villa Foscari is a patrician villa in Mira, near Venice, northern Italy, designed by the Italian Renaissance architect Andrea Palladio.  It is also known as La Malcontenta ("The Discontented"), a nickname which—according to a legend—it received when the spouse of one of the Foscaris was locked up in the house because she allegedly didn't live up to her conjugal duty.

Architecture 

The villa was commissioned by the brothers Nicolò and Alvise (Luigi) Foscari, members of a patrician Venetian family that produced Francesco Foscari, one of Venice's most noted doges. It was built between 1558 and 1560. It is located beside the Brenta canal and is raised on a pedestal, which is characteristic of Palladio's villas; this pedestal is more massive than most of Palladio's villas (the base is 11 feet high, more than twice the height Palladio normally used) because it was not possible to construct a subterranean basement on the site.

The villa lacks the agricultural buildings which were an integral part of some of the other Palladian villas. It was used for official receptions, such as that given for Henry III of France in 1574.  It has been proposed that the Villa was the home of Portia called Belmont in The Merchant of Venice.

Villa Foscari's thermal windows inspired the ones used on the facade of Villa Toeplitz (Varese) in Varese.

Interior 
The interior of the villa is richly decorated with frescoes by Battista Franco and Giambattista Zelotti.
Mythological scenes from Ovid alternate with allegories of the Arts and Virtues. As at other Palladian villas, the paintings reflect villa life in, for example, Astraea showing Jove the pleasures of the Earth. The frescoes have dulled over time, signs of the increasing threat that air pollution poses to works of art.

Recent history 
The British travel writer Robert Byron visited the villa in 1933 and afterwards wrote that bon vivant Albert Clinton Landsberg had, nine years earlier, found the villa "at the point of ruin, doorless and windowless, a granary of indeterminate farm-produce. He has made it a habitable dwelling. The proportion of the great hall and state rooms are a mathematical paean." The villa had indeed been vacated in the early 19th century, the surrounding stables and other buildings had fallen apart and were demolished by Austrian troops during the 1848 uprisings. At the end of the 19th century however, banker Baron Frédéric Emile d'Erlanger, based in Paris and London, had found the house in the above described condition, then leased the villa from the Foscari family, and undertook some renovation work. Bertie Landsberg had purchased the villa in 1926, together with his friends Paul Rodocanachi and Catherine, Baroness d'Erlanger, the daughter-in-law of the former tenant. The new owners renovated the house and gardens and invited members of the high-society to lavish salons during summer seasons: choreographer Sergei Diaghilev, dancers Boris Kochno and Serge Lifar, writer Paul Morand, architect Le Corbusier, Winston Churchill, among others. Bertie Landsberg, issue of an originally Jewish banking family, as the Erlangers, fled the Italian Fascists in 1939 and only returned to the villa in 1947. Kate d'Erlanger moved to Beverly Hills. In 1965 the English architect Claud Phillimore, 4th Baron Phillimore (1911–1994) inherited the villa from Landsberg. He began restoration, but sold the house in 1973 to count Antonio ("Tonci") Foscari (b. 1938), a descendant of the former owners and professor for architecture and preservation. He and his wife, Barbara del Vicario, undertook a painstaking process of restoring it to its original grandeur. In 2012, Foscari wrote of the villa's renaissance.

Since 1996 the building has been conserved as part of the World Heritage Site "City of Vicenza and the Palladian Villas of the Veneto".
Today, the villa is open to the public for visits on a limited basis.

See also
Ca' Foscari
Palladian Villas of the Veneto
Palladian architecture

References

External links
 
 
  Centro Internazionale di Studi di Architettura Andrea Palladio

Houses completed in 1560
Foscari
Andrea Palladio buildings
Museums in Veneto
Historic house museums in Italy
Palladian villas of Veneto